Beniamino Di Giacomo (born 13 November 1935) is a retired Italian professional football player and manager who played as a forward.

Honours
Inter
 Serie A champion: 1962–63.
 European Cup winner: 1963–64.

External links
 

1935 births
Living people
Italian footballers
Italy international footballers
Serie A players
Serie B players
S.P.A.L. players
S.S.C. Napoli players
Calcio Lecco 1912 players
Torino F.C. players
Inter Milan players
Mantova 1911 players
A.C. Cesena players
A.C. Ancona players
Italian football managers

Association football forwards